Dunajek  is a village in the administrative district of Gmina Gołdap, within Gołdap County, Warmian-Masurian Voivodeship, in northern Poland, close to the border with the Kaliningrad Oblast of Russia.

Its postal code, as of 2004, is PL-19-507.

References

Dunajek